James John Hamilton (1 March 1802 – 12 January 1876) was a British politician.

Hamilton was educated at Harrow School and Christ Church, Oxford, before joining the Rifle Brigade, in which he served as second lieutenant.  At the 1837 UK general election, he stood in Sudbury for the Conservative Party, winning election, but he stood down in December.  At both the 1841 and 1847 UK general elections, he stood in Marylebone, but did not win a seat.

Hamilton died in 1876, following which, his widow erected a memorial fountain in Portman Square.

References

1802 births
1876 deaths
Alumni of Christ Church, Oxford
Conservative Party (UK) MPs for English constituencies
People educated at Harrow School
Rifle Brigade soldiers
UK MPs 1837–1841